William J. "Tucker" Fryer (22 July 1895 in Burradon, Northumberland, England – 29 August 1960 in Linden, New Jersey) was an English-American soccer half back. He is a member of the National Soccer Hall of Fame.

Fryer began his career with Byker West End. In 1919, he signed with Barnsley F.C. and spent two season with the club before leaving England for the United States. When he arrived, he signed with Tebo Yacht Basin F.C. of the New York State League. Tebo won both the league and South New York State Cup titles in 1921, but there are no records which show Fryer was with them during that period. In the fall of 1921, Fryer moved to Todd Shipyards of the newly established American Soccer League. In 1922, Fryer and this teammates fell in the final of the National Challenge Cup to St. Louis Scullin Steel F.C. Todd Shipyards left the league at the end of the season and Fryer moved to Paterson F.C. Fryer and Paterson went to the 1923 National Challenge Cup final, defeating Scullin Steel for the title. In 1923, Paterson was sold to new ownership which moved the team to New York, renaming it the New York Giants. Fryer began the 1923–1924 season, but was sold to the Fall River Marksmen for the record fee of $1,500. He remained in Fall River until 1927 when he moved to the Brooklyn Wanderers. During his time in Fall River, Fryer won three league titles. In 1930, he moved to the Newark Americans. He finished his career with the semi-professional Clan Gordon of an unknown league.

Fryer was inducted into the National Soccer Hall of Fame in 1951.

References

External links
 National Soccer Hall of Fame profile

1895 births
1960 deaths
English footballers
Barnsley F.C. players
Tebo Yacht Basin F.C. players
American Soccer League (1921–1933) players
Todd Shipyards (soccer team) players
Paterson F.C. (NAFBL) players
New York Giants (soccer) players
Fall River Marksmen players
Brooklyn Wanderers players
Newark Americans players
National Soccer Hall of Fame members
Association football midfielders
British emigrants to the United States